The Pakistan cricket team toured Sri Lanka in July 2022 to play two Test matches against the Sri Lankan cricket team. The Test series formed part of the 2021–2023 ICC World Test Championship. In April 2022, the Pakistan Cricket Board (PCB) confirmed that the series would be taking place. Originally, the tour was also going to include three One Day International (ODI) matches, but these were cancelled in May 2022, as they were not part of the 2020–2023 ICC Cricket World Cup Super League. The fixtures for the tour were confirmed in June 2022. Pakistan last toured Sri Lanka for a Test series in June and July 2015. On 17 July 2022, Sri Lanka Cricket moved the second Test from the R. Premadasa Stadium in Colombo to the Galle International Stadium due to the economic crisis in the country.

Pakistan won the first Test by four wickets after they were set a target of 342 runs to win the match. It was Pakistan's second-highest successful run chase in Test cricket, and the highest successful run chase for any team playing a Test in Galle. Sri Lanka won the second Test by 246 runs to draw the series 1–1, with Dhananjaya de Silva scoring a century. Player of the series Prabath Jayasuriya took his fourth five-wicket haul in six innings.

Squads

Lakshitha Manasinghe was added to Sri Lanka's squad for the second Test, replacing Maheesh Theekshana who suffered a finger injury in the first Test. Pakistan's Shaheen Afridi was ruled out of the second Test after he picked up a knee injury in the first Test.

Warm-up match

Test series

1st Test

2nd Test

Statistics

Most runs

Most wickets

References

External links
 Series home at ESPN Cricinfo

2022 in Sri Lankan cricket
2022 in Pakistani cricket
International cricket competitions in 2022
Pakistani cricket tours of Sri Lanka